Prana (stylized as prAna) is an American clothing company based in Carlsbad, California. Prana is a subsidiary of Columbia Sportswear.

History
Prana was started in a garage in Carlsbad, California in 1992 by Beaver and Pam Theodosakis. They wished to make sustainably made clothes and set about sewing the pieces themselves. The company grew and was acquired in 2014 by Columbia Sportswear for $190 million.

References

External links 
 

Sportswear brands
Clothing brands of the United States
Clothing companies established in 1992
Companies based in Carlsbad, California
1992 establishments in the United States